Grant Donovan Janke (born 2 November 1990) is a South African professional rugby union player, currently playing with the . His regular position is winger or outside centre.

Career

Youth
After being included in the Griffons' squad during the 2008 Under–18 Academy Week tournament, he was then included in the  squad for the 2009, 2010 and 2011 Under-21 Provincial Championship competitions. He was especially prolific in the 2010 season, scoring nine tries in seven appearances to finish joint second in the Group B try scoring charts. A further three tries following in 2011.

Griffons
He was named in the Griffons squad for the 2010 Vodacom Cup competition, but failed to make an appearance despite being names as a reserve for their match against . He had to wait another year to make his first class debut, coming on as a second-half substitute in their 2011 Vodacom Cup match against Argentinean side  in Potchefstroom, followed by four more appearances in the same competition and another four in the 2012 Vodacom Cup.

Leopards
Shortly after that match against the Leopards, Janke actually joined the Potchefstroom-based team.

Golden Lions

He was also included in the  squad for the 2013 Varsity Cup competition, but failed to make an appearance.

References

1990 births
Living people
Golden Lions players
Griffons (rugby union) players
Leopards (rugby union) players
Rugby union players from Cape Town
South African rugby union players
Rugby union centres